Kairana Assembly constituency  is one of the 403 constituencies of the Uttar Pradesh Legislative Assembly, India. It is a part of the Shamli district (prior to 2012, Kairana was a tehsil of Muzaffarnagar district) and one of the five assembly constituencies in the Kairana Lok Sabha constituency. Kairana Assembly constituency came into existence in 1955 as a result of the "Final Order DC (1953-1955)". The extant and serial number of this constituency was last defined in "Delimitation of Parliamentary and Assembly Constituencies Order, 2008".

Wards / areas

Kairana assembly constituency comprises Gagor, Un, Chausana-1, Chausana-2, Toda, Khodsama, Shamli-Shamla, Ballamajara, Bajheri, Kera Bhau, Nai Nangla, Dathera, Baheda, Sakoti, Udpur, Machhrauli, Lawa Daudpur of Un KC, Jhinjhana KC, PCs Kairana 1 & 4, Kairana 2, Kairana 3, Mohammadpur Rai, Ramra, Panjeeth, Mamaur, Teetarvada, Unchagaon, Airati, Kandela, Dundookheda, Issopur of Kairana KC, Un NP, Jhinjhana NP & Kairana NPP of Kairana Tehsil.

Members of the Legislative Assembly

Election results

2022

2017
17th Vidhan Sabha: 2017 Assembly Elections.

2014

2012
16th Vidhan Sabha: 2012 General Elections.

15th Vidhan Sabha: 2007 Assembly Elections.

See also

Shamli district
Kairana Lok Sabha constituency
Government of Uttar Pradesh
List of Vidhan Sabha constituencies of Uttar Pradesh
Uttar Pradesh
Uttar Pradesh Legislative Assembly

References

External links
 

Assembly constituencies of Uttar Pradesh
Shamli district
Constituencies established in 1955
1955 establishments in Uttar Pradesh